Mahendrasinh Parmar is a Gujarati writer and professor from Gujarat, India. His works include Polytechnic (2016) and Rakhdu no Kagal (2016). He has also written plays.

Life 
He was born on 2 October 1967 in Naliya, a town in Kutch district of Gujarat.
He completed his Master of Arts in Gujarati literature from Bhavnagar University and received Ph.D. from same University in 1998. He serves as professor at Bhavnagar University since 1996.

He married in 1996 and  has two daughters. He lives in Bhavnagar.

Works 
Since 2002, his short stories appeared in various collections of Gujarati short stories. He has done numerous shows of public reading of literary works under the title Vachikam.
His critical works were published as Pratham in 2009. Polytechnic (2016) is a short story collection while Rakhdu no Kagal (2016) is a collection of his personal essays. He wrote several plays.

Awards
His book Polytechnic (2016) was shortlisted for the Sahitya Akademi Award (2020).

References

External links 
 
 Translation of Parmar's short story Postcard Jetli (j) Varta

1967 births
Living people
People from Bhavnagar district
Gujarati-language writers
20th-century Indian short story writers
Dramatists and playwrights from Gujarat
20th-century Indian dramatists and playwrights
Indian male dramatists and playwrights
Indian male short story writers
20th-century Indian male writers